The 2005 UCI Road World Championships took place in Madrid, Spain, between September 19 and September 25, 2005. The event consisted of a road race and a time trial for men, women and men under 23.

The Men's road race saw Belgian cyclist Tom Boonen winning.

Events summary

Medals table

External links

official site
Official results 

 
World Championships
2005 in road cycling
UCI Road World Championships by year
International cycle races hosted by Spain
September 2005 sports events in Europe
2005 in Madrid